Storrow Drive, officially James Jackson Storrow Memorial Drive, is a major crosstown parkway in Boston, Massachusetts, running east–west along the southern bank of the Charles River.  It is restricted to cars; trucks and buses are not permitted on it, while pedestrian access is available via walking paths on the Charles River side of the road. Boston drivers use the route for quick access to downtown locations.

The parkway is named for James J. Storrow, an investment banker who led a campaign to create the Charles River Basin and preserve and improve the riverbanks as a public park. He had never advocated a parkway beside the river, and his widow publicly opposed it.

Route description
The segment between the interchange with Route 28 near Copley Square and Leverett Circle, the road is officially David G. Mugar Way (formerly Embankment Road), although still signed as Storrow Drive. The entirety of this segment is concurrent with Route 28. To the west, Storrow Drive ends and becomes Soldiers Field Road at its partial junction with the Boston University Bridge (Route 2). In between, westbound Storrow Drive has a junction with the Harvard Bridge (Route 2A, Massachusetts Avenue).

Both Storrow Drive and Soldiers Field Road are maintained by the Massachusetts Department of Conservation and Recreation and are part of the parkway system interconnecting the Emerald Necklace in Boston and Brookline. Together with Memorial Drive and the Cambridge Parkway, Storrow Drive is also part of the Charles River Basin Historic District (listed in the National Register of Historic Places). Prior to 1989, Storrow Drive also carried the U.S. Route 1 designation; US 1 is now routed concurrently with Interstate 93 through the O'Neill Tunnel.

Traffic issues

The road is notorious for speeding and aggressive driving because police enforcement along the road is difficult without a breakdown lane. Radio traffic reports have warned motorists about "ponding" on Storrow Drive, which occurs when snow and frozen ground prevent water from draining properly into storm drains. The underpasses also commonly flood during heavy rains, sometimes stalling low-riding cars. Additional problems include narrow lanes and very limited visibility on short entrance ramps.

Concert parking
During some summer night concerts at the Hatch Shell, many drivers park their cars in the outbound lanes of Storrow Drive. The free concerts and fireworks displays attract 200,000 people, and many take advantage of the free parking.

Low clearance
There is an abundance of signs giving road clearance height. Despite the signs, a truck or other large vehicle will periodically get wedged under a bridge, which causes traffic to back up for several miles. In one incident a truck full of scissors became stuck and spilled its cargo, causing more than 30 cars to get flat tires. There is a  height limit for the entire parkway. Local media has taken to referring to these kinds of accidents as a truck being "Storrowed", and the city of Boston has annual advisories in August to those renting box trucks for college move-ins to avoid the city's low-clearance parkway system, including Storrow Drive.

Pedestrian crossings
Because Storrow Drive is a high-speed road way, pedestrian access is limited to only the Charles River side of the road. To connect the Charles River Esplanade and Storrow Drive (a popular park and recreational area along the south bank of the river) to adjacent Boston neighborhoods, a number of pedestrian overpasses have been constructed. Listed in order from downstream to upstream, they are:
Blossom Street bridge (near Massachusetts General Hospital)
Frances Appleton Bridge (at Cambridge Street, next to Longfellow Bridge)
Arthur Fiedler Bridge (connecting to the Hatch Memorial Shell near Arlington Street)
Dartmouth Street bridge
Fairfield Street bridge
Harvard Bridge (at Massachusetts Avenue)
Silber Way bridge
Boston University Marsh Chapel bridge
Boston University Bridge

History
Between 1958 and 1971, Storrow Drive was designated Massachusetts Routes C1 and C9.

Early opposition
James Storrow had been instrumental in earlier projects along the Charles River, in particular the Charles River Dam. Additions to the Charles River Esplanade had been made during the 1930s only by omitting an important part of the project, a proposed highway from the Longfellow Bridge to the Cottage Farm (Boston University) Bridge, which had provoked tremendous protest. After Helen Storrow, the wife of the now deceased James Storrow, supported a group opposed to the highway, it was dropped; part of the funding was to have come from a million-dollar gift from her. Soon after Helen Storrow's death in 1944, a new proposal for the construction of the highway was pushed through the Massachusetts Legislature. In spite of still strong opposition, and through some dubious parliamentary procedures, the bill approving construction of the highway and naming it after James Storrow was passed in 1949.

Construction
Construction took place in the years 1950–1951. As part of the attempt to preserve park land, any land used by the highway had to be replaced by reclaiming new land along the shoreline. Storrow Drive was officially opened in a ribbon cutting ceremony by Governor Paul A. Dever on June 15, 1951.

An on-ramp leading from southbound Massachusetts Avenue to eastbound Storrow Drive was constructed but later removed, leaving an island of greenspace between the inbound and outbound carriageways.  Overpasses to Fenway via Charlesgate and in the vicinity of Massachusetts General Hospital were completed a few years later; the Arthur Fiedler Footbridge was completed in 1953.  In 1960, high-pressure air from a sewage tunnel under construction caused a geyser-like eruption and damaged the roadway near the BU bridge.  The pedestrian overpass near the Longfellow Bridge was constructed in 1962. A "Reverse Curve" sign near downtown was vandalized to say "Reverse the Curse", a reference to the Curse of the Bambino; the sign was removed after the Red Sox won the 2004 World Series.

Future
The Storrow Drive Tunnel, through which Storrow Drive runs along the Esplanade just north of Clarendon, Berkeley and Arlington Streets, has been deteriorating since it was built in 1951. By mid-2007, the Department of Conservation and Recreation determined that repairing the tunnel may be impossible because it was not waterproofed when it was built, and damage in the intervening years has been significant.  Consequently the tunnel may have to be rebuilt at a cost upward of $200 million, a project that would require closing critical sections of Storrow Drive to traffic.

Despite the chaos this project would cause to drivers, it also could present an opportunity for the city to improve the area.  For example, former Boston Mayor Thomas Menino proposed covering Storrow Drive near the pedestrian Arthur Fiedler Bridge, replacing the old overpass with a wide, ground-level park space that would better connect the green space of Boston's Public Garden with the Esplanade.

Other plans for the road propose closing it to traffic on Sunday mornings in the summer, much as is done across the river on Memorial Drive in Cambridge.  This would create a recreational area for walking, biking and roller blading on weekends, though this has been criticized as unnecessary due to the presence of the nearby Esplanade paths and the existing Memorial Drive road closure. Regardless, Storrow Drive east of Massachusetts Avenue is usually closed to traffic and open to pedestrians and cyclists during the Independence Day (July 4) celebration at the Esplanade.

Exit list
Mileposts continue east from Soldiers Field Road. The entire route is in Boston, Suffolk County.

See also
 Memorial Drive, on the opposite side of the river in Cambridge
 Charles River Bike Path
Charles River Reservation
 List of crossings of the Charles River

References

External links
 Storrow Drive on Steve Anderson's BostonRoads.com
 Recorded Youtube Video, Storrow Drive: Boston, MA Freewayjim, 2012-09-21

Streets in Boston
Parkways in Massachusetts
U.S. Route 1